Deutsche Bank AG, sometimes referred to simply as Deutsche, is a German multinational investment bank  and financial services company headquartered in Frankfurt, Germany, and dual-listed on the Frankfurt Stock Exchange and the New York Stock Exchange. It was founded in 1870 and grew through multiple acquisitions, including Disconto-Gesellschaft in 1929 (as a consequence of which it was known from 1929 to 1937 as Deutsche Bank und Disconto-Gesellschaft or "DeDi-Bank"), Bankers Trust in 1998, and Deutsche Postbank in 2010.

As of 2018, the bank's network spanned 58 countries with a large presence in Europe, the Americas, and Asia. As of 2021, Deutsche Bank was the 21st largest bank in the world by total assets and 93rd in the world by market capitalization. It is a component of the DAX stock market index, and often referred to as the largest German banking institution even though the Sparkassen-Finanzgruppe comes well ahead in terms of combined assets. Deutsche Bank has been designated as a global systemically important bank by the Financial Stability Board since 2011.

Deutsche Bank is a universal bank with four major divisions: Investment Bank, Corporate Bank, Private Bank and Asset Management (DWS). Its investment banking operations often command substantial deal flow.

According to the New Yorker, Deutsche Bank has long had an "abject" reputation among major banks, as it has been involved in major scandals across different issue areas.

History

1870–1919
Deutsche Bank was founded on 1870 in Berlin as a specialist bank for financing foreign trade and promoting German exports. It subsequently played a large part in developing Germany's financial services industry, as its business model focused on providing finance to industrial customers. The bank's statute was adopted on 22 January 1870, and on 10 March 1870 the Prussian government granted it a banking license. The statute laid great stress on foreign business: 

Three of the founders were Georg Siemens, whose father's cousin had founded Siemens and Halske; Adelbert Delbrück and Ludwig Bamberger. Prior to the founding of Deutsche Bank, German importers and exporters were dependent upon British and French banking institutions in the world markets—a serious handicap in that German bills were almost unknown in international commerce, generally disliked and subject to a higher rate of a discount than English or French bills.

Founding members 
 Hermann Zwicker (Bankhaus Gebr. Schickler, Berlin)
 Anton Adelssen (Bankhaus Adelssen & Co., Berlin)
 Adelbert Delbrück (Bankhaus Delbrück, Leo & Co.)
 Heinrich von Hardt (Hardt & Co., Berlin, New York)
 Ludwig Bamberger (politician, former chairman of Bischoffsheim, Goldschmidt & Co)
 Victor Freiherr von Magnus (Bankhaus F. Mart Magnus)
  (Bankhaus Deichmann & Co., Cologne)
 Gustav Kutter (Bankhaus Gebrüder Sulzbach, Frankfurt)
 Gustav Müller (Württembergische Vereinsbank, Stuttgart)

First directors 
 Wilhelm Platenius, Georg Siemens and Hermann Wallich

The bank's first domestic branches, inaugurated in 1871 and 1872, were opened in Bremen and Hamburg. Its first oversea-offices opened in Shanghai in 1872 and London in 1873 followed by South American offices between 1874 and 1886. The branch opening in London, after one failure and another partially successful attempt, was a prime necessity for the establishment of credit for the German trade in what was then the world's money center.

Major projects in the early years of the bank included the Northern Pacific Railroad in the US and the Baghdad Railway (1888). In Germany, the bank was instrumental in the financing of bond offerings of steel company Krupp (1879) and introduced the chemical company Bayer to the Berlin stock market.

The second half of the 1890s saw the beginning of a new period of expansion at Deutsche Bank. The bank formed alliances with large regional banks, giving itself an entry into Germany's main industrial regions. Joint ventures were symptomatic of the concentration then under way in the German banking industry. For Deutsche Bank, domestic branches of its own were still something of a rarity at the time; the Frankfurt branch dated from 1886 and the Munich branch from 1892, while further branches were established in Dresden and Leipzig in 1901.

In addition, the bank rapidly perceived the value of specialist institutions for the promotion of foreign business. Gentle pressure from the Foreign Ministry played a part in the establishment of Deutsche Ueberseeische Bank in 1886 and the stake taken in the newly established Deutsch-Asiatische Bank three years later, but the success of those companies showed that their existence made sound commercial sense.

1919–1933

In 1919, the bank purchased the state's share of Universum Film Aktiengesellschaft (Ufa). In 1926, the bank assisted in the merger of Daimler and Benz.

The bank merged with other local banks in 1929 to create Deutsche Bank and Disconto-Gesellschaft. In 1937, the company name changed back to Deutsche Bank.

1933–1945
After Adolf Hitler came to power, instituting the Third Reich, Deutsche Bank dismissed its three Jewish board members in 1933. In subsequent years, Deutsche Bank took part in the aryanization of Jewish-owned businesses, provided the owners of “aryanized” businesses were in the know about their Jewish status beforehand; according to its own historians, the bank was involved in 363 such confiscations by November 1938. In 1938, German bank Mendelssohn & Co. was acquired. During the war, Deutsche Bank incorporated other banks that fell into German hands during the occupation of Eastern Europe. Deutsche Bank provided banking facilities for the Gestapo and loaned the funds used to build the Auschwitz camp and the nearby IG Farben facilities.

During World War II, Deutsche Bank became responsible for managing the Bohemian Union Bank in Prague, with branches in the Protectorate and in Slovakia, the Bankverein in Yugoslavia (which has now been divided into two financial corporations, one in Serbia and one in Croatia), the Albert de Barry Bank in Amsterdam, the National Bank of Greece in Athens, the Creditanstalt-Bankverein in Austria and Hungary, the Deutsch-Bulgarische Kreditbank in Bulgaria, and Banca Comercială Română (The Romanian Commercial Bank) in Bucharest. It also maintained a branch in Istanbul, Turkey.

In 1999, Deutsche Bank confirmed officially that it had been involved in the Auschwitz camp. In December 1999, Deutsche, along with other major German companies, contributed to a US$5.2 billion compensation fund following lawsuits brought by Holocaust survivors; U.S. officials had threatened to block Deutsche Bank's $10 billion purchase of Bankers Trust, a major American bank, if it did not contribute to the fund. The history of Deutsche Bank during the Second World War has since been documented by independent historians commissioned by the Bank.

Post-World War II

Following Germany's defeat in World War II, the Allied authorities, in 1948, ordered Deutsche Bank's break-up into regional banks. These regional banks were later consolidated into three major banks in 1952: Norddeutsche Bank AG; Süddeutsche Bank AG; and Rheinisch-Westfälische Bank AG. In 1957, these three banks merged to form Deutsche Bank AG with its headquarters in Frankfurt.

In 1959, the bank entered retail banking by introducing small personal loans. In the 1970s, the bank pushed ahead with international expansion, opening new offices in new locations, such as Milan (1977), Moscow, London, Paris, and Tokyo. In the 1980s, this continued when the bank paid U$603 million in 1986 to acquire Banca d'America e d'Italia.

In 1972, the bank established its Fiduciary Services Division which provides support to its private wealth division.

At 8:30 am on 30 November 1989, Alfred Herrhausen, chairman of Deutsche Bank, was killed when a car that he was in exploded while he was traveling in the Frankfurt suburb of Bad Homburg. The Red Army Faction claimed responsibility for the blast.

In 1989, the first steps towards creating a significant investment-banking presence were taken with the acquisition of Morgan, Grenfell & Co., a UK-based investment bank which was renamed Deutsche Morgan Grenfell in 1994. In 1995 to greatly expand into international investments and money management, Deutsche Bank hired Edson Mitchell, a risk specialist from Merrill Lynch, who hired two other former Merrill Lynch risk specialists Anshu Jain and William S. Broeksmit. By the mid-1990s, the buildup of a capital-markets operation had got underway with the arrival of a number of high-profile figures from major competitors. Ten years after the acquisition of Morgan Grenfell, the US firm Bankers Trust was added. Bankers Trust suffered losses during the 1998 Russian financial crisis since it had a large position in Russian government bonds, but avoided financial collapse by being acquired by Deutsche Bank for $10 billion in November 1998. On 4 June 1999, Deutsche Bank merged its Deutsche Morgan Grenfell and Bankers Trust to became Deutsche Asset Management (DAM) with Robert Smith as the CEO. This made Deutsche Bank the fourth-largest money management firm in the world after UBS, Fidelity Investments, and the Japanese post office's life insurance fund. At the time, Deutsche Bank owned a 12% stake in DaimlerChrysler but United States banking laws prohibit banks from owning industrial companies, so Deutsche Bank received an exception to this prohibition through 1978 legislation from Congress.

Deutsche continued to build up its presence in Italy with the acquisition in 1993 of Banca Popolare di Lecco from Banca Popolare di Novara for about $476 million. In 1999, it acquired a minority interest in Cassa di Risparmio di Asti.

21st century

In the 11 September 2001 terrorist attacks the Deutsche Bank Building in Lower Manhattan, formerly Bankers Trust Plaza, was heavily damaged by the collapse of the South Tower of the World Trade Center. Demolition work on the 39-story building continued for nearly a decade, and was completed in early 2011.

In October 2001, Deutsche Bank was listed on the New York Stock Exchange. This was the first NYSE listing after interruption due to 11 September attacks. The following year, Josef Ackermann became CEO of Deutsche Bank and served as CEO until 2012 when he became involved with the Bank of Cyprus. Then, beginning in 2002, Deutsche Bank strengthened its U.S. presence when it purchased Scudder Investments. Meanwhile, in Europe, Deutsche Bank increased its private-banking business by acquiring Rued Blass & Cie (2002) and the Russian investment bank United Financial Group (2005) founded by the United States banker Charles Ryan and the Russian official Boris Fyodorov which followed Anshu Jain's aggressive expansion to gain strong relationships with state partners in Russia. Jain persuaded Ryan to remain with Deutsche Bank at its new Russian offices and later, in April 2007, sent the president and chairman of the management board of VTB Bank Andrey Kostin's son Andrey to Deutsche Bank's Moscow office. Later, in 2008, to establish VTB Capital, numerous bankers from Deutsche Bank's Moscow office were hired by VTB Capital. In Germany, further acquisitions of Norisbank, Berliner Bank and Deutsche Postbank strengthened Deutsche Bank's retail offering in its home market. This series of acquisitions was closely aligned with the bank's strategy of bolt-on acquisitions in preference to so-called "transformational" mergers. These formed part of an overall growth strategy that also targeted a sustainable 25% return on equity, something the bank achieved in 2005.

On 1 October 2003, Deutsche Bank and Dresdner Bank entered into a payment transaction agreement with Postbank to have Postbank process payments as the clearing center for the three banks.

Since the mid-1990s Deutsche Bank commercial real estate division offered Donald Trump financial backing, even though in the early 1990s Citibank, Manufacturers Hanover, Chemical, Bankers Trust, and 68 other entities refused to financially support him.

In 2008, Trump sued Deutsche Bank for $3 billion and a few years later, he shifted his financial portfolio from the investment banking division to Deutsche Bank private wealth division with Rosemary Vrablic, formerly of Citigroup, Bank of America, and Merrill Lynch, becoming Trump's new personal banker at Deutsche Bank.

In 2007, the company's headquarters, the Deutsche Bank Twin Towers building, was extensively renovated for three years, certified LEED Platinum and DGNB Gold.

In 2010, the bank developed and owned the Cosmopolitan of Las Vegas, after the casino's original developer defaulted on its borrowings. Deutsche Bank ran it at a loss until its sale in May 2014. The bank's exposure at the time of sale was more than $4 billion, and sold the property to Blackstone Group for $1.73 billion.

Great Recession and European debt crisis (2007–2012)

Housing credit bubble and CDO market 

Deutsche Bank was one of the major drivers of the expansion of the collateralized debt obligation (CDO) market during the housing credit bubble from 2004 to 2008, creating about $32 billion worth. The 2011 US Senate Permanent Select Committee on Investigations report on "Wall Street and the Financial Crisis" analyzed Deutsche Bank as a case study of investment banking involvement in the mortgage bubble, CDO market, credit crunch, and recession. It concluded that even as the market was collapsing in 2007, and its top global CDO trader was deriding the CDO market and betting against some of the mortgage bonds in its CDOs, Deutsche bank continued to churn out bad CDO products to investors.

The report focused on one CDO, Gemstone VII, made largely of mortgages from Long Beach, Fremont, and New Century, all notorious subprime lenders. Deutsche Bank put risky assets into the CDO, like ACE 2006-HE1 M10, which its own traders thought was a bad bond. It also put in some mortgage bonds that its own mortgage department had created but could not sell, from the DBALT 2006 series. The CDO was then aggressively marketed as a good product, with most of it being described as having A level ratings. By 2009 the entire CDO was almost worthless and the investors (including Deutsche Bank itself) had lost most of their money.

Greg Lippmann, head of global CDO trading, was betting against the CDO market, with approval of management, even as Deutsche was continuing to churn out product. He was a major character in Michael Lewis' book The Big Short, which detailed his efforts to find 'shorts' to buy Credit Default Swaps (CDS) for the construction of Synthetic CDOs. He was one of the first traders to foresee the bubble in the CDO market as well as the tremendous potential that CDS offered in this. As portrayed in The Big Short, Lipmann in the middle of the CDO and MBS frenzy was orchestrating presentations to investors, demonstrating his bearish view of the market, offering them the idea to start buying CDS, especially to AIG in order to profit from the forthcoming collapse. As regards the Gemstone VII deal, even as Deutsche was creating and selling it to investors, Lippman emailed colleagues that it 'blew', and he called parts of it 'crap' and 'pigs' and advised some of his clients to bet against the mortgage securities it was made of. Lippman called the CDO market a 'ponzi scheme', but also tried to conceal some of his views from certain other parties because the bank was trying to sell the products he was calling 'crap'. Lippman's group made money off of these bets, even as Deutsche overall lost money on the CDO market.

Deutsche was also involved with Magnetar Capital in creating its first Orion CDO. Deutsche had its own group of bad CDOs called START. It worked with Elliot Advisors on one of them; Elliot bet against the CDO even as Deutsche sold parts of the CDO to investors as good investments. Deutsche also worked with John Paulson, of the Goldman Sachs Abacus CDO controversy, to create some START CDOs. Deutsche lost money on START, as it did on Gemstone.

On 3 January 2014, it was reported that Deutsche Bank would settle a lawsuit brought by US shareholders, who had accused the bank of bundling and selling bad real estate loans before the 2008 downturn. This settlement came subsequent and in addition to Deutsche's $1.93 billion settlement with the US Housing Finance Agency over similar litigation related to the sale of mortgage-backed securities to Fannie Mae and Freddie Mac.

Leveraged super-senior trades 
Former employees including Eric Ben-Artzi and Matthew Simpson have claimed that, during the crisis, Deutsche failed to recognize up to $12 billion of paper losses on its $130 billion portfolio of leveraged super senior trades, although the bank rejects the claims. A company document of May 2009 described the trades as "the largest risk in the trading book", and the whistleblowers allege that had the bank accounted properly for its positions its capital would have fallen to the extent that it might have needed a government bailout. One of them claims that "If Lehman Brothers didn't have to mark its books for six months it might still be in business, and if Deutsche had marked its books it might have been in the same position as Lehman."

Deutsche had become the biggest operator in this market, which were a form of credit derivative designed to behave like the most senior tranche of a CDO. Deutsche bought insurance against default by blue-chip companies from investors, mostly Canadian pension funds, who received a stream of insurance premiums as income in return for posting a small amount of collateral. The bank then sold protection to US investors via the CDX credit index, the spread between the two was tiny but was worth $270m over the 7 years of the trade. It was considered very unlikely that many blue chips would have problems at the same time, so Deutsche required collateral of just 10% of the contract value.

The risk of Deutsche taking large losses if the collateral was wiped out in a crisis was called the gap option. Ben-Artzi claims that after modeling came up with "economically unfeasible" results, Deutsche accounted for the gap option first with a simple 15% "haircut" on the trades (described as inadequate by another employee in 2006) and then in 2008 by a $1–2bn reserve for the credit correlation desk designed to cover all risks, not just the gap option. In October 2008, it stopped modeling the gap option and just bought S&P put options to guard against further market disruption, but one of the whistleblowers has described this as an inappropriate hedge. A model from Ben-Artzi's previous job at Goldman Sachs suggested that the gap option was worth about 8% of the value of the trades, worth $10.4bn. Simpson claims that traders were not simply understating the gap option but actively mismarking the value of their trades.

European debt crisis, 2009–today

In 2008, Deutsche Bank reported its first annual loss in five decades, despite receiving billions of dollars from its insurance arrangements with AIG, including US$11.8 billion from funds provided by US taxpayers to bail out AIG.

Based on a preliminary estimation from the European Banking Authority (EBA), in late 2011, Deutsche Bank AG needed to raise capital of about €3.2 billion as part of a required 9% core Tier 1 ratio after sovereign debt write-down starting in mid-2012.

As of 2012, Deutsche Bank had negligible exposure to Greece, but Spain and Italy accounted for a tenth of its European private and corporate banking business with credit risks of about €18 billion in Italy and €12 billion in Spain.

In 2017, Deutsche Bank needed to get its common equity tier-1 capital ratio up to 12.5% in 2018 to be marginally above the 12.25% required by regulators.

Since 2012
In January 2014, Deutsche Bank reported a €1.2 billion ($1.6 billion) pre-tax loss for the fourth quarter of 2013. This came after analysts had predicted a profit of nearly €600 million, according to FactSet estimates. Revenues slipped by 16% versus the prior year.

Deutsche Bank's Capital Ratio Tier-1 (CET1) was reported in 2015 to be only 11.4%, lower than the 12% median CET1 ratio of Europe's 24 biggest publicly traded banks, so there would be no dividend for 2015 and 2016. Furthermore, 15,000 jobs were to be cut.

In June 2015, the then co-CEOs, Jürgen Fitschen and Anshu Jain, both offered their resignations to the bank's supervisory board, which were accepted. Jain's resignation took effect in June 2015, but he provided consultancy to the bank until January 2016. Fitschen continued as joint CEO until May 2016. The appointment of John Cryan as joint CEO was announced, effective July 2016; he became sole CEO at the end of Fitschen's term.

In January 2016, Deutsche Bank pre-announced a 2015 loss before income taxes of approximately €6.1 billion and a net loss of approximately €6.7 billion. Following this announcement, a bank analyst at Citi declared: "We believe a capital increase now looks inevitable and see an equity shortfall of up to €7 billion, on the basis that Deutsche may be forced to book another €3 billion to €4 billion of litigation charges in 2016."

May 2017, Chinese conglomerate HNA Group became its biggest shareholder, owning 9.90% of its shares.
However, HNA Group's stake reduced to 8.8% as of February 16, 2018.

In November 2018, the bank's Frankfurt offices were raided by police in connection with investigations around the Panama papers and money laundering. Deutsche Bank released a statement confirming it would "cooperate closely with prosecutors".

AUTO1 FinTech is a joint venture of AUTO1 Group, Allianz, SoftBank and Deutsche Bank.

In February 2019, HNA Group announced cutting stake in Deutsche Bank to 6.3 percent. It was further reduced to 0.19 percent as at March 2019.

During the Annual General Meeting in May 2019, CEO Christian Sewing said he was expecting a "deluge of criticism" about the bank's performance and announced that he was ready to make "tough cutbacks" after the failure of merger negotiations with Commerzbank AG and weak profitability. According to The New York Times, "its finances and strategy [are] in disarray and 95 percent of its market value [has been] erased".  News headlines in late June 2019 claimed that the bank would cut 20,000 jobs, over 20% of its staff, in a restructuring plan. On 8 July 2019, the bank began to cut 18,000 jobs, including entire teams of equity traders in Europe, the US, and Asia. On the previous day, Sewing had laid blame on unnamed predecessors who created a "culture of poor capital allocation" and chasing revenue for the sake of revenue, according to a Financial Times report, and promised that going forward, the bank "will only operate where we are competitive".

In January 2020, Deutsche Bank had decided to cut the bonus pool at its investment branch by 30% following restructuring efforts.

In February 2021, it was reported that Deutsche Bank made a profit of €113 million ($135.6 million) for 2020, the first annual net profit it had posted since 2014.

In March 2021, Deutsche Bank sold about $4 billion of holdings seized in the implosion of Archegos Capital Management in a private deal. The move helped Deutsche Bank emerge unscathed after Archegos defaulted on margin loans used to build up highly leveraged bets on stocks.

Leadership history 
When Deutsche Bank was first organized in 1870 there was no CEO. Instead the board was represented by a speaker of the board. Beginning in February 2012, the bank has been led by two co-CEOs; in July 2015 it announced it would be led by one CEO beginning in 2016. The management bodies are the annual general meeting, supervisory board and management board.

Logotype
In 1972, the bank created the world-known blue logo "Slash in a Square" – designed by Anton Stankowski and intended to represent growth within a risk-controlled framework.

Corporate governance

Shareholders 
Deutsche Bank is one of the leading listed companies in German post-war history. Its shares are traded on the Frankfurt Stock Exchange and, since 2001, also on the New York Stock Exchange and are included in various indices, including the DAX and the Euro Stoxx 50. As the share had lost value since mid-2015 and market capitalization had shrunk to around €18 billion, it temporarily withdrew from the Euro Stoxx 50 on 8 August 2016. With a 0.73% stake, it is currently the company with the lowest index weighting.

In 2001, Deutsche Bank merged its mortgage banking business with that of Dresdner Bank and Commerzbank to form Eurohypo AG. In 2005, Deutsche Bank sold its stake in the joint company to Commerzbank.

Business divisions
The bank's business model rests on three pillars – the Corporate & Investment Bank (CIB), the Private & Commercial Bank and Asset Management (DWS).

Corporate & Investment Bank (CIB)

The Corporate & Investment Bank (CIB) is Deutsche Bank's capital markets business. The CIB comprises the below six units.

 Corporate Finance is responsible for advisory and mergers & acquisitions (M&A).
 Equities / Fixed Income & Currencies. These two units are responsible for sales and trading of securities.
 Global Capital Markets (GCM) is focused on financing and risk management solutions. It includes debt and equity issuances.
 Global Transaction Banking (GTB) caters to corporates and financial institutions by providing commercial banking products including cross-border payments, cash management, securities services, and international trade finance.
 Deutsche Bank Research provides analysis of products, markets, and trading strategies.

Private & Commercial Bank

 Private & Commercial Clients Germany / International is the retail bank of Deutsche Bank. In Germany, it operates under two brands – Deutsche Bank and Postbank. Additionally, it has operations in Belgium, Italy, Spain and India. The businesses in Poland and Portugal are in the process of being sold.
 Wealth Management functions as the bank's private banking arm, serving high-net-worth individuals and families worldwide. The division has a presence in the world's private banking hotspots, including Switzerland, Luxembourg, the Channel Islands, the Cayman Islands and Dubai.

Deutsche Asset Management (DWS)
Deutsche Bank holds a majority stake in the listed asset manager DWS Group (formerly Deutsche Asset Management), which was separated from the bank in March 2018.

Controversies
Deutsche Bank in general as well as specific employees have frequently figured in controversies and allegations of deceitful behavior or illegal transactions. As of 2016, the bank was involved in some 7,800 legal disputes and calculated €5.4 billion as litigation reserves, with a further €2.2 billion held against other contingent liabilities. According to the New Yorker, Deutsche Bank has long had an "abject" reputation. Between 2008 and 2016, Deutsche Bank paid around nine billion dollars in fines and settlements related to wrongdoings across different issue areas. The FinCEN file leaks documented around $1.3 trillion of suspicious transactions through Deutsche Bank between 1999 and 2017. More than half of all suspicious transactions involving major banks in the FinCEN files leaks involved Deutsche Bank.

Role in financial crisis of 2007–2008

In January 2017, Deutsche Bank agreed to a $7.2 billion settlement with the United States Department of Justice over its sale and pooling of toxic mortgage securities in the years leading up to the Financial crisis of 2007–2008.  As part of the agreement, Deutsche Bank was required to pay a civil monetary penalty of $3.1 billion and provide $4.1 billion in consumer relief, such as loan forgiveness. At the time of the agreement, Deutsche Bank was still facing investigations into the alleged manipulation of foreign exchange rates, suspicious equities trades in Russia, as well as alleged violations of United States sanctions against Iran and other countries. Since 2012, Deutsche Bank had paid more than €12 billion for litigation, including a deal with U.S. mortgage-finance giants Fannie Mae and Freddie Mac.

Espionage scandal, 2009
In 2009, the bank admitted it engaged in covert espionage on its critics from 2001 to 2007 directed by its corporate security department, although it characterized the incidents as "isolated". According to The Wall Street Journal, Deutsche Bank had prepared a list of names of people who it wanted investigated for criticism of the bank, including Michael Bohndorf (an activist investor in the bank), Leo Kirch (a former media executive in litigation with the bank), and the Munich law firm of Bub Gauweiler & Partner, which represented Kirch. According to  the Wall Street Journal, the bank's legal department was involved in the scheme along with its corporate security department. The bank hired Cleary Gottlieb Steen & Hamilton to investigate the incidents on its behalf. The Cleary firm submitted its report, which however was not made public. According to The Wall Street Journal, the Cleary firm uncovered a plan by which Deutsche Bank was to infiltrate the Bub Gauweiler firm by having a bank mole hired as an intern at the Bub Gauweiler firm. The plan was allegedly cancelled after the intern was hired but before she started work. Peter Gauweiler, a principal at the targeted law firm, was quoted as saying "I expect the appropriate authorities including state prosecutors and the bank's oversight agencies will conduct a full investigation."

Deutsche Bank's law firm Cleary Gottlieb Steen & Hamilton in Frankfurt published a report in July 2009 saying, it found no systemic misbehaviour and there was no indication that present members of the management board had been involved in any activity that raises legal issues or has had any knowledge of such activities. This was confirmed by the Public Prosecutor's Office in Frankfurt in October 2009. BaFin found deficiencies in operations within Deutsche Bank's security unit in Germany but no systemic misconduct. The bank said it took steps to strengthen controls for the mandating of external service providers by its Corporate Security Department.

Deutsche Bank document release, 2014
On 26 January 2014, William S. Broeksmit, a risk specialist at Deutsche Bank who was very close to Anshu Jain and hired by Edson Mitchell to spearhead Deutsche Bank's foray into international investments and money management in the 1990s, released numerous Deutsche Bank documents from the New York branch of the Deutsche Bank Trust Company Americas (DBTCA), which Broeksmit's adopted son Val Broeksmit, who is a close friend of Moby, later gave, along with numerous emails, to both Welt am Sonntag and ZDF, which revealed numerous irregularities including both a $10 billion money laundering scheme spearheaded by the Russia branch of Deutsche Bank at Moscow, which the New York State Department of Financial Services fined Deutsche Bank $425 million, and derivatives improprieties.

Libor scandal, 2015

On 23 April 2015, Deutsche Bank agreed to a combined US$2.5 billion in fines – a US$2.175 billion fine by American regulators, and a €227 million penalty by British authorities – for its involvement in the Libor scandal uncovered in June 2012. It was one of several banks colluding to fix interest rates used to price hundreds of trillions of dollars of loans and contracts worldwide, including mortgages and student loans. Deutsche Bank also pleaded guilty to wire fraud, acknowledging that at least 29 employees had engaged in illegal activity. It was required to dismiss all employees who were involved with the fraudulent transactions. However, no individuals were charged with criminal wrongdoing. In a Libor first, Deutsche Bank will be required to install an independent monitor. Commenting on the fine, Britain's Financial Conduct Authority director Georgina Philippou said "This case stands out for the seriousness and duration of the breaches ...  One division at Deutsche Bank had a culture of generating profits without proper regard to the integrity of the market. This wasn't limited to a few individuals but, on certain desks, it appeared deeply ingrained." The fine represented a record for interest rate related cases, eclipsing a $1.5 billion Libor related fine to UBS, and the then-record $450 million fine assessed to Barclays earlier in the case. The size of the fine reflected the breadth of wrongdoing at Deutsche Bank, the bank's poor oversight of traders, and its failure to take action when it uncovered signs of abuse internally.

U.S. sanctions violations, 2015 
On 5 November 2015, Deutsche Bank was ordered to pay US$258 million (€237.2 million) in penalties imposed by the New York State Department of Financial Services (NYDFS) and the United States Federal Reserve Bank after the bank was caught doing business with Burma, Libya, Sudan, Iran, and Syria, which were under US sanctions at the time. According to the US federal authorities, Deutsche Bank handled 27,200 US dollar clearing transactions valued at more than US$10.86 billion (€9.98 billion) to help evade US sanctions between early 1999 until 2006 which were done on behalf of Iranian, Libyan, Syrian, Burmese, and Sudanese financial institutions and other entities subject to US sanctions, including entities on the Specially Designated Nationals by the Office of Foreign Assets Control.

In response to the penalties, the bank will pay US$200 million (€184 million) to the NYDFS while the rest (US$58 million; €53.3 million) will go to the Federal Reserve. In addition to the payment, the bank will install an independent monitor, fire six employees who were involved in the incident, and ban three other employees from any work involving the bank's US-based operations.

Tax evasion, 2016
In June 2016 six former employees in Germany were accused of being involved in a major tax fraud deal with CO2 emission certificates, and most of them were subsequently convicted. It was estimated that the sum of money in the tax evasion scandal might have been as high as €850 million. Deutsche Bank itself was not convicted due to an absence of corporate liability laws in Germany.

Dakota Access Pipeline, 2016 

Environmentalists criticize Deutsche Bank for co-financing the controversial Dakota Access Pipeline, which is planned to run close to an Indian reservation and is seen as a threat to their livelihood by its inhabitants.

Deutsche Bank has issued a statement addressing the criticism it received from various environmental groups.

Russian money-laundering operations
In January 2017, the bank was fined $425 million by the New York State Department of Financial Services (DFS) and £163 million by the UK Financial Conduct Authority regarding accusations of laundering $10 billion out of Russia.

In the decade preceding the Russian mirror-trading scheme, Deutsche Bank was informed of substantial and widespread compliance concerns. The offsetting trades in this instance lacked economic purpose and could have been used to facilitate money laundering or other illegal activity. On January 30, 2017, the NYSDFS (New York State Department of Financial Services) fined Deutsche Bank $425 million for violating New York's anti-money laundering laws. There was a "mirror trading" scheme involved. Deutsche Bank's Moscow, London, and New York branches laundered $10 billion out of Russia.

The Global Laundromat scandal revealed Deutsche Bank's involvement in a vast money-laundering operation over the period 2010–2014. The operation may have involved as much as $80 billion. In 2019, The Guardian reported that a confidential internal report at Deutsche Bank showed that the bank could face fines, legal action, and even possible prosecution of senior management over the bank's role in the money laundering.

In 2020, it was reported that Deutsche Bank was pursuing an expansion of its Russia operations.

In the wake of Russia's 2022 invasion of Ukraine, Deutsche Bank refused to close down its Russia business. At the same time, other banks and major businesses were exiting Russia.

Relationship with Donald Trump, 1995–2021

Deutsche Bank is widely recognized as being the largest creditor to real-estate-mogul-turned-politician Donald Trump, 45th President of the United States, lending him and his company more than $2 billion over twenty years ending 2020. The bank held more than $360 million in outstanding loans to him prior to his 2016 election. Although his 2019 final report never mentioned Deutsche Bank, as of December 2017, Special Counsel Robert Mueller investigated Deutsche Bank's role in Trump and Russian parties allegedly cooperating to elect him. , Deutsche Bank's relationship with Trump was also under investigation by two U.S. congressional committees and by the New York attorney general.

In April 2019, House Democrats subpoenaed the Bank for Trump's personal and financial records. On 29 April 2019, U.S. President Donald Trump, his business, and his children Donald Trump Jr., Eric Trump, and Ivanka Trump sued Deutsche Bank and Capital One bank to block them from turning over financial records to congressional committees. On 22 May 2019, judge Edgardo Ramos of the federal District Court in Manhattan rejected the Trump suit against Deutsche Bank, ruling the bank must comply with congressional subpoenas. Six days later, Ramos granted Trump's attorneys their request for a stay so they could pursue an expedited appeal through the courts. In October 2019, a federal appeals court said the bank asserted it did not have Trump's tax returns. In December 2019, the Second Circuit Court of Appeals ruled that Deutsche Bank must release Trump's financial records, with some exceptions, to congressional committees; Trump was given seven days to seek another stay pending a possible appeal to the Supreme Court.

In May 2019, The New York Times reported  that anti-money laundering specialists in the bank detected what appeared to be suspicious transactions involving entities controlled by Trump and his son-in-law Jared Kushner, for which they recommended filing suspicious activity reports with the Financial Crimes Enforcement Network of the Treasury Department, but bank executives rejected the recommendations. One specialist noted money moving from Kushner Companies to Russian individuals and flagged it in part because of the bank's previous involvement in a Russian money-laundering scheme.

On 19 November 2019, Thomas Bowers, a former Deutsche Bank executive and head of the American wealth management division, was reported to have committed suicide in his Malibu home. Bowers had been in charge of overseeing and personally signing over $360 million in high-risk loans for Trump's National Doral Miami resort. The loans had been subject to a criminal investigation by special counsel Robert Mueller in his investigation of the president's 2016 campaign involvement in Russian election meddling. Documents on those loans have also been subpoenaed from Deutsche Bank by the House Democrats together with the financial documents of the president. A relationship between Bowers's responsibilities and apparent suicide has not been established; the Los Angeles County Medical Examiner – Coroner closed the case, giving no indication to wrongdoing by third parties.

In early 2021, Deutsche Bank elected to discontinue its relationship with Donald Trump following the January 6 United States Capitol attack.

Fine for business with Jeffrey Epstein, 2020 
Deutsche Bank lent money and traded currencies for the well-known sex offender Jeffrey Epstein up to May 2019, long after Epstein's 2008 guilty plea in Florida to soliciting prostitution from underage girls, according to news reports. Epstein and his businesses had dozens of accounts through the private-banking division. From 2013 to 2018, "Epstein, his related entities and his associates" had opened over forty accounts with Deutsche Bank.

According to The New York Times, Deutsche Bank managers overruled compliance officers who raised concerns about Epstein's reputation.

The bank found suspicious transactions in which Epstein moved money out of the United States, The Times reported.

On 7 July 2020, the New York Department of Financial Services (DFS) imposed a $150 million penalty on Deutsche Bank, in connection with Epstein. The bank had "ignored red flags on Epstein".

On 24 November, two unnamed women that accused Epstein of sexual abuse and sex trafficking also sued Deutsche Bank for its role in enabling Epstein to run his sex-trafficking operations by ignoring red flags regarding his account and the withdrawal of suspiciously high sums of money.

Involvement in Danske Bank money-laundering scandal, 2018 
On 19 November 2018, a whistleblower of the Danske Bank money laundering scandal stated that a large European bank was involved in helping Danske process $150 billion in suspect funds. Although the whistleblower, Howard Wilkinson, did not name Deutsche Bank directly, another inside source claimed the institute in question was Deutsche Bank's U.S. unit.
In 2020 it became known that the U.S. arm of Deutsche Bank processed more than $150 billion of the $230 billion dirty money through New York, for which it was fined 150 million $. After a raid in 2019, Frankfurt-based prosecutors imposed a fine of $15.8 million in 2020 for DB's failure on more than 600 occasions to promptly report suspicious transactions.

Improper handling of ADRs, 2018

On 20 July 2018, Deutsche Bank agreed to pay nearly $75 million to settle charges of improper handling of "pre-released" American depositary receipt (ADRs) under investigation of the U.S. Securities and Exchange Commission (SEC). Deutsche Bank didn't admit or deny the investigation findings but agreed to pay disgorgement of more than $44.4 million in ill-gotten gains plus $6.6 million in prejudgment interest and a penalty of $22.2 million.

Malaysian 1MDB fund 
In July 2019, U.S. prosecutors investigated Deutsche Bank's role in a multibillion-dollar fraud scandal involving the 1Malaysia Development Berhad, or 1MDB. Deutsche Bank helped raise $1.2 billion for the 1MDB in 2014. As of May 2021 Malaysia sued Deutsche Bank to recover billions in alleged losses from a corruption scandal at the fund.

Commodities trading, bribery fine, 2021 
In January 2021, Deutsche Bank agreed to pay a U.S. fine of more than $130 million for a scheme to conceal bribes to foreign officials in countries such as Saudi Arabia and China, and the city of Abu Dhabi, between 2008 and 2017 and a commodities case where it spoofed precious metals futures.

Strip club scandal, 2022 
In March 2022, Ben Darsney, Ravi Raghunathan, Brandon Sun, and Daniel Gaona were exposed for trying to expense strip club nights out as legitimate business visits.  Brandon Sun attempted to cover up the incident, but the bankers were let go for violating the Company Code of Conduct.

Acquisitions
 Disconto-Gesellschaft in Berlin, 1929
 Mendelssohn & Co. 1938
 Morgan, Grenfell & Company, 1990
 Bankers Trust, 30 November 1998
 Scudder Investments, 2001
 RREEF, 2002
 Berkshire Mortgage Finance, 22 October 2004
 Chapel Funding (now DB Home Lending), 12 September 2006
 Norisbank, 2 November 2006
 MortgageIT, 3 January 2007
 Hollandsche Bank-Unie, 2 July 2008
 Sal. Oppenheim, 2010
 Deutsche Postbank, 2010
 Park Plaza Mall (enclosed shopping center in Little Rock, Arkansas), 2021

Notable employees

 Hermann Josef Abs, former chair (1957–1968)
 Paul Achleitner, chairman of the supervisory board
 Josef Ackermann, former CEO (2002–2012)
 Friedrich Wilhelm Christians, former co-head of Deutsche Bank
 Michael Cohrs, former head of Global Banking (2002–2010)
 John Cryan, former CEO (2015–2018)
 Sir John Craven – financier in London
 Jürgen Fitschen, former co-chair
 David Folkerts-Landau, head of Research
 Katherine Garrett-Cox, chief executive officer
 Alfred Herrhausen, former chair (1988–1989)
 Henry Jackson – founder of OpCapita
 Anshu Jain, former head of Corporate and Investment Banking
 Sajid Javid, former Managing-Director (2007–2009)
 Josh Frydenberg, former director of global banking (2005)
 Otto Hermann Kahn – philanthropist
 Karl Kimmich, former chair (1942–1945)
 Hilmar Kopper, former chairman of the board of Deutsche Bank (1989–1997)
 Philip May, spouse of a former prime minister of the United Kingdom
 Steven Reich – CEO of Deutsche Bank Trust Company Americas, associate deputy attorney general (2011–2013)
 Georg von Siemens, co-founder and director (1870–1900)
 Georg Solmssen, former chair (short time 1933)
 Johannes Teyssen, (chair of the management board of E.ON)
 Ted Virtue – executive board member
 Hermann Wallich, co-founder and director (1870–1893)
 Boaz Weinstein – derivatives trader
 Chandra Wilson – actress

See also

European Financial Services Roundtable
Cash Group
List of largest banks
List of corporate collapses and scandals

Notes

References

External links 

 

 
 Historical Association of Deutsche Bank
 Deutsche Bank in the Federal Financial Supervisory Authority (BaFin) database
 Literature by and about Deutsche Bank in the German National Library

 
1870 establishments in Germany
Banks established in 1870
Banks under direct supervision of the European Central Bank
Companies listed on the Frankfurt Stock Exchange
Companies listed on the New York Stock Exchange
Exchange-traded funds
Financial services companies established in 1870
German brands
Companies involved in the Holocaust
German companies established in 1870
Investment banks
Investment management companies of Germany
Multinational companies headquartered in Germany
Primary dealers
Systemically important financial institutions